Mood for the Blues is a 1960 album by saxophonist Plas Johnson.

Reception
The initial Billboard magazine review from February 6, 1961 commenting that "The indomitable tenor stylist performs in front of a full bank of strings and with a robust rhythm section on this set of lushy blues standards."

Track listing
 "Don't Let the Sun Catch You Cryin'" (Joe Greene)
 "One Mint Julep" (Rudy Toombs)
 "How Long Has This Been Going On?" (George Gershwin, Ira Gershwin)
 "Blues In My Heart" (Benny Carter, Irving Mills)
 "I've Got a Right to Cry"
 "Please Send Me Someone to Love" (Percy Mayfield)
 "Tanya"
 "Fool That I Am"
 "Chloe"
 "Since I Fell for You" (Buddy Johnson)
 "A Mood for the Blues"
 "I Wanna Be Loved" (Johnny Green, Edward Heyman, Billy Rose)

Personnel
Plas Johnson – tenor saxophone
Ray Johnson – piano
Ernie Freeman – Hammond B-3 organ
Rene Hall, Bill Pittman – guitar
Red Callender – double bass
Earl Palmer – drums
Unknown strings
Gerald Wilson, René Hall – arranger

References

1960 albums
Albums arranged by Gerald Wilson
Albums recorded at Capitol Studios
Capitol Records albums
Instrumental albums
Plas Johnson albums